Beverly Anne Mock is an American geneticist who is a deputy director of the National Cancer Institute's Center for Cancer Research.

Life 
Mock obtained a Ph.D. in zoology from the University of Maryland, College Park in 1983.  Her dissertation was titled, The population biology of Trypanosoma diemyctyli. She continued her studies on the genetics of susceptibility to parasitic diseases in the department of immunology at the Walter Reed Army Institute of Research.

Since coming to the National Institutes of Health, she has focused her research on complex genetic traits associated with cancer initiation and progression in an effort to develop strategies for identifying and analyzing drug combinations to target susceptibility pathways.

Mock is a deputy director of the National Cancer Institute's Center for Cancer Research, deputy chief of the NCI laboratory of cancer biology and genetics, and head of the cancer genetics section.

Selected works

References 

Living people
Place of birth missing (living people)
Year of birth missing (living people)
20th-century American women scientists
21st-century American women scientists
20th-century American biologists
21st-century American biologists
American women geneticists
American geneticists
National Institutes of Health people
American medical researchers
Women medical researchers
University of Maryland, College Park alumni